Likeleli Alinah Thamae (born 4 January 1978) is a Lesotho taekwondo practitioner. 

She competed at the 2000 Summer Olympics in Sydney, where she placed seventh in women's flyweight.

References

External links

1978 births
Living people
Lesotho female taekwondo practitioners
Olympic taekwondo practitioners of Lesotho
Taekwondo practitioners at the 2000 Summer Olympics